Second Armenian TV Channel Company, also known as H2 or Armenia 2, is a private television company broadcasting in Armenia and Artsakh. Approximately 95% of the TV viewers of Armenia and Artsakh are able to watch the channel, which broadcasts 18 hours daily. The company employs 250 people.

The news block of the TV channel is called Lraber (meaning "Herald") which has its own reporters throughout Armenia and Artsakh. The international overview is carried out based on the German Deutsche Welle TV channel. H2 TV also cooperates with the Russian channels Russia-1 and NTV and other foreign channels.
  
The president and the director of the TV channel is Samvel Mayrapetyan.

The offices and the studios of the TV are located in the Ajapnyak district of Yerevan.

References

External links
Official website (Armenian and English)
Armenian TV

Television stations in Armenia
Television networks in Armenia
Television channels and stations established in 1999
1999 establishments in Armenia